Hugo Eberhardt (2 May 1874, Furtwangen im Schwarzwald − 8 April 1959) was a German Architect.

Biography 
Eberhardt started his career as a ship interior architect for Norddeutscher Lloyd, After working in Kos as an archeologist for a German ministry and as an inspector of construction in Frankfurt he became manager of the School of Technology and Design (today HfG Offenbach design school) in Offenbach in 1907. Ten years later he founded the German Leather Museum. 

Most buildings Eberhardt designed were public buildings or luxurious mansions. In Offenbach survived three buildings: the office building of the Heyne factory, the AOK insurance and the main building of the HfG Offenbach.

References

External links

Website of the HfG Offenbach
Website of the German Leather Museum

1874 births
1959 deaths
People from Furtwangen im Schwarzwald
19th-century German architects
Commanders Crosses of the Order of Merit of the Federal Republic of Germany
20th-century German architects